The Itala Special was a special custom-built Grand Prix race car, designed, developed, produced, and raced by Emilio Materassi, which competed between 1924 and 1927. It with an Isotta Fraschini chassis and Itala bodywork, and used half of an Hispano-Suiza aircraft engine.

References

Grand tourers
Grand tourer racing cars
Cars of Italy
1920s cars
Cars introduced in 1924
Pre-war vehicles